Vago is an unincorporated community in Greenbrier County, West Virginia, United States. It is located on the Greenbrier River. 

A post office called Vago was established in 1910, and remained in operation until it was discontinued in 1953.

References

Unincorporated communities in Greenbrier County, West Virginia
Unincorporated communities in West Virginia